The Men's super-G competition at the FIS Alpine World Ski Championships 2019 was held on 6 February.

Results
The race was started at 12:30.

References

Men's super-G